D'Cuckoo was a women's multimedia ensemble of electronic percussion music formed in mid-1980s by Tina Blaine, an ethnomusicologist and African drum expert, and Candice Pacheco, electronic musician and acoustic marimba player. It also included Tina Phelps, a trained Japanese ritual Taiko drummer, Jennifer Hruska, Terrie Odabi, and co-founder Patti Clemens, former The Second City comedy trouper. Over time the size of the band ranged from 3 to 10 members including drummer Janelle Burdell (Planet Drum, Tupac) . Virtual reality expert Linda Jacobson, their production manager, described them as a "neo-classical, post-industrial techno-tribal world funk ensemble".

A notable performance was at the Bridge Conference on Psychedelics at Stanford University in 1991. Psychedelic luminaries  attending D'Cuckoo's performance included Timothy Leary.

The group played an array of electronic marimbas and drums designed by the band along with the help of Silicon Valley engineers bringing in hi-tech Digital GFX and more. They were not exactly marimbas and drums: striking an instrument produces a musical sample, which may be a sample from a song. In 1992 the group cooperated with technologist Linda Jacobson, who assisted them with designing large interactive multimedia performances. In addition, in 1993 she was part of the ensemble as the voice of a computer-generated puppet.

The group's inventions include the MidiBall, a device for interactive musical participation. The MidiBall  is an inflatable ball with sensors, so that when it is bouncing around the auditorium and touched by the audience, it produces sounds and images, and in addition, it sends the signals to the stage and alters the sounding of the music.

Another interactive tool they used was "Bliss Paint" invented by Greg Jalbert, which was essentially a screensaver program modified to be controlled by audience for changing the visual imagery of the performance.

Discography
1994: Umoja, RGB Records, # 501 The title means "Unity" in Swahili

References

Percussion ensembles